"Dying Is Fine" was one of the first songs written by Ra Ra Riot. It was released several times, and was reworked for their first full album, The Rhumb Line, in 2008. The song was inspired by the E. E. Cummings poem, dying is fine)but death

History and release
"Dying Is Fine" was written in January 2006. Ra Ra Riot recorded "Dying Is Fine" on a Daytrotter Session on October 15, 2007.

It was reworked and re-recorded several times; as a single for V2 Records, on the  2007 EP Ra Ra Riot, and on the first album release, The Rhumb Line, on Barsuk Records.

"Dying Is Fine" was chosen as the Free MP3 of the Day on music blog Spinner on July 17, 2008.<ref>Ra Ra Rio, 'Dying Is Fine' - Free MP3 of the Day - Spinner.com, spinner.com, July 27, 2008</ref>

E. E. Cummings poem inspiration
The song is based on E. E. Cummings poem dying is fine)but death''. The lyric "Death oh baby/You know that dying is fine but maybe/I wouldn't like death if death's for good/Not even if death were good" mirrors the poem's introduction:

"
?o
baby
i

wouldn't like

Death if Death
were
good
"

References

External links
dying is fine)but death

2008 singles
2008 songs
V2 Records singles
E. E. Cummings